Umaro Baldé (born 23 June 1999) is a footballer who plays for Portuguese club Varzim in Liga 3. Born in Portugal, he represents Guinea-Bissau at international level.

Early life
Umaro Baldé started playing youth football with Odivelas, moving to the Sporting CP Youth Academy in 2011. He then joined Sacavenense and Tondela for the remainder of his youth career. In 2018, he joined Marítimo U23.

Club career
In July 2018, he joined Marítimo B in the Campeonato de Portugal, also spendng time with their U23 side.

In July 2021, he joined Vilafranquense in Liga Portugal 2. In January 2022, he was loaned to Liga 3 side Torreense for the remainder of the season. He helped Torreense earn promotion to the second tier.

In January 2023, he joined Varzim in Liga 3.

International career
He was called up to the Guinea-Bissau national team for the first time in September 2022. He made his debut in a friendly against Martinique.

References

External links
 

1999 births
Living people